Geeta Pasi (born 1962) is a retired American diplomat. She was the American ambassador to Djibouti from 2011 to 2014. She was appointed American ambassador to Chad in June 2016 and served until 2018. In September 2018, she left the ambassadorship to become Principal Deputy to the Assistant Secretary of State for African Affairs.

On March 5, 2021, Ambassador Geeta Pasi presented her credentials to President Sahle-Work Zewde of Ethiopia.

As of February 25, 2022, she has retired as ambassador.

Education 
Pasi was awarded a Bachelor of Arts degree from Duke University in 1984 and completed a Master of Arts at New York University in 1986.

State Department career 
Pasi was appointed ambassador to Djibouti by United States President Barack Obama in 2011.

She had previously held a number of diplomatic positions including deputy Chef de mission at the United States embassy in Bangladesh from 2006 to 2009.

On June 15, 2020, President Trump announced his intent to nominate Pasi to be the next United States Ambassador to Ethiopia. On June 18, 2020, her nomination was sent to the Senate. She appeared before the Senate Foreign Relations Committee on December 2 and was confirmed by voice vote of the full Senate in the early morning hours of December 22, 2020.

Personal life
Pasi speaks French, German, Hindi, Romanian, and Russian.

References

|-

|-

1962 births
Living people
Ambassadors of the United States to Djibouti
People from New York (state)
Duke University alumni
New York University alumni
American women ambassadors
Ambassadors of the United States to Chad
United States Foreign Service personnel
21st-century American diplomats
21st-century American women
American women diplomats